The Halifax Grammar School (HGS) is an independent, coeducational day school in Halifax, Nova Scotia, Canada. It is located in south-end Halifax, near Saint Mary's University. Approximately 575 students attend the school. At the high school level students take the International Baccalaureate (IB) Diploma Program. The Head of School is Steven Laffoley. All prospective students undergo entrance testing before being admitted. The school offers merit-based scholarships in academics, community service, and athletics.

Schools
The school is divided into the Prep School (Grades Junior-Primary through Grade 4), the Middle School (Grades 5 through 9), and the Senior School (Grades 10 to 12). Each school has its own Head of School and teaching staff.

The Halifax Grammar School is located at 945 Tower Road and houses Junior Primary through grade 12. The Halifax Grammar School used to occupy two campuses, one located on Atlantic Street, and the other on Tower Road but an expansion was added on to the Tower Road campus, opening for the 2018-2019 school year allowing the entire school to be housed in a single campus. A building at 420 Tower Road was the original location of the school before they purchased the building on Atlantic Street, which they soon decided to expand. For two years, the School rented the Bethany building on the corner of Tower Road and Inglis Street from Saint Mary's University, before purchasing the closed Tower Road School building from the City of Halifax.

Academics
Halifax Grammar maintains a high level of academic achievement. The school has offered the International Baccalaureate program, which provides an internationally accepted qualification for entry into higher education, in its Senior School since 1993. All School Students are enrolled in the International Baccalaureate Diploma Program starting in Grade 10.

Admission
The school is a tuition-based academic institution, with an admission fee to enrol a new student and other, additional costs. Students wear uniforms on assembly days and at special events.

Arts
The school's arts program is run by three teachers, including the painter Renee Forestall who teaches visual arts in the Middle and Senior Schools. At the High School level, students have the option of taking IB Standard Level Art.

Students may participate in the school's seven bands, learning repertoire from jazz, popular, and classical music. Prep School students in grades 3 and 4 must sing in the school choir, which performs several times each year in the community. Middle School students mount an annual dramatic production, often Shakespeare, while Senior School students produce an annual musical.

The school has a performing arts studio, funded through donations and fundraising efforts, that was completed in 2012.

Recent musicals
The school has run a Senior musical for over a decade. Actors, lighting technicians, and stage staff are all students. The school hires independent directors, band members and sound staff. The musicals that have been produced are:
 2021-2022: Pippin (musical)
 2019-2020: Newsies (musical)
 2018-2019: Seussical
 2017-2018: HGS Cabaret
 2016-2017: Grease
 2015-2016: Guys and Dolls
 2014-2015: Sweet Charity
 2013-2014: Anything Goes
 2012-2013: She Loves Me
 2011-2012: The 25th Annual Putnam County Spelling Bee
 2010-2011: Charlie and the Chocolate Factory (musical)
 2009-2010: Urinetown
 2008-2009: The Boyfriend
 2007-2008: Into the Woods
 2006-2007: Bye Bye Birdie
 2005-2006: Guys and Dolls
 2004-2005: Fiddler on the Roof
 2003-2004: The Pajama Game
 2002-2003: Grease

Athletics
Boys and girls teams at Middle and Senior School levels compete in the primary athletic league of secondary schools in the province, the NSSAF. The school competes in a variety of sports including soccer, basketball, hockey, golf, track and field, cross country, skiing, badminton, and touch football. Halifax Grammar's Senior Varsity Basketball teams rank highly in Division 1 among the best high school teams in the province despite the small number of high school students in the school.

Past achievements for Grammar's athletic teams:

2021 
 Senior Boys Basketball: 2nd place, Boys Division 1 Capital Region
 Senior Girls Basketball: 5th place, Girls Division 1 Capital Region
 
2020 
 Girls Golf: Capital Region Banner
 Senior Boys Basketball: Division 1 Boys Basketball Regional Banner and Provincial Silver Medalist
 Senior Girls Basketball: Division 2 Girls Basketball Regional Banner and Provincial Bronze Medalist
 Junior Boys Ski: Capital Regional Banner
 
2019
 Senior Girls X-Country: Regional Banner and Provincial Bronze Medalist
 Senior Boys X-Country: Regional Banner and Provincial Bronze Medalist
 Intermediate Boys X-Country: Citadel Zone Champions
 Senior Boys Basketball: 2nd place, Boys Division 1 for Capital Region and NSSAF Provincial Silver Medalist
 Junior Boys Skiing: Metro and Capital Regional Banner and Provincial Silver Medalists
 Junior Boys Table Tennis: NSSAF Silver Medalists
 Intermediate Boys singles Table Tennis: Capital Region Champion
 Senior Boys singles Table Tennis: Capital Region Silver Medalist 
 Intermediate Boys Track and Field: 2nd place, Capital Region Championships
 
2018
 Junior Boys Table Tennis: Regional and Provincial Champions
 Intermediate Boys X-Country: NSSAF Provincial Champions
 Intermediate Boys Cross Country: Capital Region Champions
 Senior Girls Basketball: NSSAF Division 3 Girls Basketball Capital Region Champions
 Junior Boys Basketball: Capital Zone Banner
 Senior Boys Basketball: 4th place, Metro Division 1 Boys Region and qualified for Provincials
 Junior Boys and Intermediate Girls Skiing: NSSAF Provincial Champions
 Senior Boys and Senior Girls Skiing: NSSAF Ski Provincial Champions 
 Track and Field Division 3: NSSAF Provincial Champions
 
2017
 Junior Boys X-Country: Citadel Zone Champions
 Senior Boys X-Country: 2nd place, Capital Region Championships
 Senior Girls Soccer: Division 3 Capital Region Champions
 Senior Boys Soccer: Division 2 Capital Region Champions
 Intermediate Track and Field: Capital Region Champions
 Track and field: Division 3 NSSAF Provincial Champions
 
2016
 Junior Girls X-Country: Citadel Zone Championships
 Intermediate Boys X-Country: Citadel Zone Champions, 2nd at Capital Region Championships, 3rd at NSSAF Provincial Championships
 Senior Boys X-Country: 3rd place, Capital Region Championships
 Senior Boys Basketball: Division 1 Boys Metro Region Finalists and NSSAF Bronze Medalists
 Intermediate Boys and Girls Skiing: Capital Region Champions and NSSAF Provincial Champions
 Senior Boys Skiing: Provincial Champions
 Division 3 Senior Girls Soccer Capital Region Champions
 Division 3 Senior Boys Soccer Capital Region Champions

Notable alumni
Herbert Clifford
John Charles Beckwith (British Army officer)
 Russell Smith - novelist
 Jay Ferguson - musician, member of Sloan
Noah Pink - screenwriter, television producer, director, and swimmer
Elliot Page - actor
J. J. Gould - journalist
Jared Paul Stern - writer
Craig Silverman - journalist
David Goldbloom - psychiatrist
Alison Murray - filmmaker
Steven Laffoley - educator and author
Ben Proudfoot - filmmaker
Bill Black (businessman)
John Risley - businessman

Notable faculty 
William Cochran (priest)

References

External links
 http://www.hgs.ns.ca - official site

Preparatory schools in Nova Scotia
Private schools in Nova Scotia
Elementary schools in Nova Scotia
Middle schools in Nova Scotia
High schools in Halifax, Nova Scotia
Schools in Halifax, Nova Scotia
International Baccalaureate schools in Nova Scotia
Educational institutions established in 1958
1958 establishments in Canada